Parsegh Shahbaz (June 1883 – 1915) was an Ottoman Armenian lawyer, political activist, journalist, and columnist. He was a member of the Armenian Revolutionary Federation. During the Armenian genocide, Shahbaz was deported to Çankırı and then Harput where he was killed.

Biography

Parsegh Shahbaz was born in Constantinople in the district of Boyacikoy in June 1883. He received his early education in Constantinople in the Armenian schools of Mayr Varjaran, Getronagan, and Mkhitarian. He then continued his education in Venice, Italy at the San Lazzaro degli Armeni. During his time in Italy, Shahbaz met Avetis Aharonian who convinced him to join the Armenian Revolutionary Federation. Shahbaz returned to Constantinople where he began publishing the Tsaghig (Armenian: Flower) newspaper. In 1903, after the attempted assassination of Armenian Patriarch of Constantinople Malachia Ormanian, members of the Armenian Revolutionary Federation were blamed. Under intense scrutiny, Shahbaz fled to Alexandria, Egypt. In Egypt, Shahbaz became a laborer for five years while he continued to contribute to various local Armenian journals and newspapers. These newspapers included Azad Khosk, Grag, the Mdrag Periodical, and Hachyun. After the Young Turk revolution in 1908, Shahbaz returned to the Ottoman Empire where he continued his political activism. He then went to Bulgaria and then back to Egypt where he got married in 1912. He then moved to Paris, France in order to continue his studies in law. While in Paris, he continued contributing to various journals such as Mikayel Varandian's Pro Armenia and other newspapers such as Horizon and Hayrenik.

In August 1914, after World War I had begun, Shahbaz returned to Istanbul under the orders of Victor Bérard to gather support for the war effort from Armenian Revolutionary Federation members in the Ottoman Empire on behalf of the Triple Entente.

Death
On 24 April 1915, Parsegh Shahbaz was arrested in Istanbul in the middle of the night deportation of Armenian notables during the Armenian genocide. According to the writer Yervant Odian, who lived an apartment floor below him, Shahbaz's wife was worried and "still hasn't calmed down" for a long time after his arrest.

Shahabaz was deported to Ayash along with other Armenian intellectuals. He was sent to M. Aziz, where it was believed that Shahbaz was "murdered in the road between Harput and Malatya." In a letter to Miss. Zaruhi Bahri and Evgine Khachigian, Shahbaz wrote from Aintab on 6 July 1915 that due to his wounded feet and stomach aches, he would rest for 6–7 days until he had to continue the 8–10 days journey to M. Aziz. But he had no idea why he was sent there. According to B. Vahe-Haig (Պ. Վահէ-Հայկ), survivor of the massacre of Harput, Parsegh Shahbaz was jailed eight days after the massacre in the central prison of Mezre. He remained without food for a week and was severely beaten and finally killed by gendarmes under the wall of 'a factory'.

See also
Armenian literature
Ottoman Armenians
Armenian National Movement
Western Armenia

References

Lawyers from Istanbul
1883 births
1915 deaths
Armenian-language writers
People who died in the Armenian genocide
Armenians from the Ottoman Empire
20th-century writers from the Ottoman Empire
San Lazzaro degli Armeni alumni
Writers from Istanbul
Lawyers from the Ottoman Empire